Cornelis Gijsbertus "Kees" van Aelst (28 September 1916 in The Hague – 6 September 2000 in Utrecht) was a Dutch water polo player who competed in the 1936 Summer Olympics. He was part of the Dutch team which finished fifth in the 1936 tournament. He played all seven matches.

References

1916 births
2000 deaths
Dutch male water polo players
Water polo players at the 1936 Summer Olympics
Olympic water polo players of the Netherlands
Sportspeople from The Hague
20th-century Dutch people